Rudolph J. Wojta (* August 10, 1944) is an Austrian journalist and co-founder of the festival Shakespeare in Styria.

Wojta was born and raised in Vienna. Whilst studying literature and psychology he began to publish short stories in German and Austrian newspapers, including Die Welt and Die Presse. In 1975, he joined the weekly newspaper Wochenpresse as critic in the fields of architecture, literature, theatre, cinema and art. In 1979 he joined the newly founded magazine WIENER for which he served as editor in chief from 1981 to 1982. He then rejoined the Wochenpresse where he remained until the newspaper folded in 1996. Subsequently, he worked as freelance writer, author and contributor. In 2002, together with Nicholas Allen he founded Shakespeare in Styria, an annual festival in the town of Murau showcasing a Shakespeare play in English with young European professional actors. From 2003 on, he also lived in Murau. In 2010 he returned to Vienna.

References

Austrian journalists
1944 births
Living people